The Anishinabek Nation, also known as the Union of Ontario Indians, is a First Nations political organization representing 39 member Anishinabek Nation First Nations in Canada in the province of Ontario, Canada.  The organization's roots predate European contact in the 16th century, in the Council of Three Fires. The Union of Ontario Indians was incorporated in 1949 to serve as a political advocate and secretariat for the Anishinabek First Nations. The Anishinabek peoples speak Anishinaabemowin and Lunaape (in Munsee Delaware Nation) within the Anishinabek Nation territory in Ontario. In 2017, the Council changed its identification using the name "Union of Ontario Indians" only for legally-binding agreements but for all other purposes referred to themselves as Anishinabek Nation. The head office for the Union of Ontario Indians is located at Nipissing First Nation near North Bay, Ontario.

The Anishinabek Nation is guided by a Leadership Council, consisting of a Grand Council Chief, four (4) Regional Deputy Grand Council Chiefs, and Nation Councils representing four geographic regions: Southeast, Southwest, Lake Huron, and Northern Superior. In 2018, an organizational restructuring introduced four regional deputy grand council chiefs. In 2007 the organization appointed an Anishinabek Women's Water Commission to advise on water issues and management of the Great Lakes. As of May 2022, the current Grand Council Chief is Reg Niganobe.

In the early 21st century, there are about 60,000 citizens of the Anishinabek Nation member communities, accounting for about one-third of the total First Nations population in the province of Ontario.

See also
 Anishinabek Police Service
Anishinabek Educational Institute
 Anishinabek News

References

External links
 Anishinabek Nation website

 
Political advocacy groups in Canada
Anishinaabe tribal political organizations
First Nations organizations in Ontario